Lactarius fulvissimus is a species of fungus in the family Russulaceae. It was first described scientifically by Henri Romagnesi in 1954.

See also
List of Lactarius species

References

External links

fulvissimus
Fungi described in 1954
Fungi of Europe